Santosh Kumar Yadav is a 1995 batch IAS officer of the Uttar Pradesh cadre. Currently he is the chairperson of the National Highways Authority of India.
 Yadav has been Chief Development Officer in Unnao, Ghazipur, Kanpur Nagar, Kanpur Dehat and Bulandshahr districts of Uttar Pradesh. He has served as Collector and District Magistrate in Ghaziabad, Bareilly, Aligarh and Lalitpur districts. He has also served as Additional Secretary, Director and Divisional Commissioner in several divisions of Uttar Pradesh. He was also the secretary to the Chief Minister of Uttar Pradesh.

He is appointed as the Chairperson of the National Highways Authority of India by the Government of India on 26 December 2022.

References